The Nasik Caves, or Trirashmi Leni (Trirashmi being the name of the hills in which the caves are located, Leni being a Marathi word for caves), are a group of 23 caves carved between the 1st century BCE and the 3rd century CE, though additional sculptures were added up to about the 6th century, reflecting changes in Buddhist devotional practices. The Buddhist sculptures are a significant group of early examples of Indian rock-cut architecture initially representing the  Early Buddhist schools tradition.

Most of the caves are viharas except for Cave 18 which is a chaitya of the 1st century BCE by Sunga dynasty.  The style of some of the elaborate pillars or columns, for example in caves 3 and 10, is an important example of the development of the form. The location of the caves is a holy Buddhist site and is located about 8 km south of the centre of Nashik (or Nasik), Maharashtra, India. The Pandavleni name sometimes given to the Nasik Caves has nothing to do with the Pandavas, characters in the Mahabharata epic. Other caves in the area are Karla Caves, Bhaja Caves, Patan Cave and Bedse Caves.

Caves
These are a group of twenty four Hinayana Buddhist caves whose excavation was financed by the local Jain Kings. Cave No 3 is a large vihara or monastery with some interesting sculptures. Cave No 10 is also a vihara and almost identical in design to Cave No 3, but is much older and finer in detail. It is thought to be nearly as old as the Karla Cave near Lonavala. Cave No 18 is a chaitya worship hall believed to be similar in date to the Karla Caves. It is well sculptured, and its elaborate facade is particularly noteworthy. The cave houses the statues of Buddha, Jain Teerthankara Vrishabhdeo, and icons of the bodhisattva, Veer Manibhadraji and Ambikadevi. The interiors of the caves were popular meeting places for the disciples, where sermons were delivered. There are water tanks that have been skilfully carved out of the solid rock.

These caves are some of the oldest in Maharashtra. Some of them are large and contain numerous chambers - these rock-cut caves served as a viharas or monasteries for the monks to meet and hear sermons. They contain interesting sculptures. One of the vihara caves is older and finer in sculptural detail and is thought to be nearly as old as the Karla Cave near Lonavala. Another (cave No. 18) is a chaitya (type of cave used for chanting and meditation). It is similar in age to some of the Karla Caves and has a particularly elaborate facade.

The cave has images of Buddhas, Bodhisattvas, sculptures representing the King, farmers, merchants and rich iconography depicting a beautiful amalgamation of Indo - Greek architecture

The site has an excellent ancient water management system and skillfully chiseled out of solid rock are several attractive water tanks.

History

The caves can be traced back up to the 1st century BCE by inscriptions recording donations. Out of the twenty-four caves, two caves are a major attraction - the main cave which is the Chaitya (prayer hall) has a beautiful Stupa; the second one is cave no. 10 which is complete in all structural as well inscriptions. Both the caves have pictures of Buddha over the rocks. The caves are facing eastwards. So it is recommended to visit the caves early morning as in sunlight the beauty of carvings is enhanced.

The caves were called Pundru which in Pali language means "yellow ochre color". This is because the caves were the residence of Buddhist monks who wore "the chivara or the yellow robes". Later on, the word Pundru changed to Pandu Caves (as per Ancient Monuments Act 26 May 1909). Decades later people started calling it Pandav Caves - a misnomer which is used for every cave in India.

The various inscriptions confirm that Nashik in that period was ruled by 3 dynasties – the Western Kshatrapas, the Satavahanas and the Abhiras. It seems there was always a conflict between Satavahanas and the Kshatrapas over supremacy. However, all the 3 kings fully supported Buddhism. The inscriptions also confirm that apart from the kings, local merchants, landlords too supported and donated huge sums for the development of these caves.

Layout and content
The group of 24 caves was cut in a long line on the north face of a hill called Trirasmi. The main interest of this group lies not only in its bearing on its walls a number of inscriptions of great historical significance belonging to the reign of Satavahana & Kshaharatas or Kshatrapas. But also in its representing a brilliant phase in the Rock-Cut architecture of the second century CE. There are altogether 24 excavations though many of these are small & less important. Beginning at the east end they may conveniently be numbered westward. They are almost entirely of an early date and were excavated by the Hinayana sect. Mostly, the interior of the caves are starkly plain, in contrast to the heavily ornamented exterior.

The caves and their inscriptions
Inscriptions in caves 3, 11, 12, 13, 14, 15, 19 and 20 are legible. Other inscriptions note the names Bhattapalika, Gautamiputra Satkarni, Vashishthiputra Pulumavi of the Satavahanas, two of the Western Satraps, Ushavadata and his wife Dakshamitra, and the Yavana (Indo-Greek) Dhammadeva.

Since the caves were inhabited by the Mahayana as well as the Hinayana sects of Buddhism, one can see a nice confluence of structural and carvings.

Caves No. 1-2

Cave No.3, "Gautamiputra vihara" (circa 150 CE)

Cave No.3 at Nasik is one of the most important caves, and the largest, of the Pandavleni caves complex. It was built and dedicated to the Samgha in the 2nd century CE by Queen Gotami Balasiri, mother of deceased Satavahana king Gautamiputra Satakarni, and contains numerous important inscriptions.

The cave
The cave is a vihara type of cave, meant to provide shelter to Buddhist monks. It is, with cave No10, the largest Vihara cave in the Pandavleni Caves complex. The hall is 41 feet wide and 46 deep, with a bench round three sides. The cave has six pillars on the front porch, roughly similar to those of the early cave No10 built by the viceroy of Nahapana circa 120 CE. Inside, 18 monk cells are laid out according to a square plan, seven on the right side, six in the back, and five in the left.

Entrance
The central door into this is rudely sculptured in a style that reminds the Sanchi gateways; the side pilasters are divided into six compartments, each filled mostly with two men and a woman, in different stages of some story which seems to end in the woman being carried off by one of the men.
Over the door are the three symbols, the Bodhi tree, the dagoba, and the chakra, with worshipers, and at each side is a dvarapala, or doorkeeper, holding up a bunch of flowers. If the carving on this door be compared with any of those at Ajanta, it will be found very much ruder and less bold, but the style of headdress agrees with that on the screen walls at Karle and Kanheri, and in the paintings in Cave X at Ajanta, which probably belong to about the same age.

Pillars

The veranda has six octagonal columns without bases between highly sculptured pilasters. The capitals of these pillars are distinguished from those in the Nahapana Cave No.10 by the shorter and less elegant form of the bell-shaped portion of them, and by the corners of the frame that encloses the torus having small figures attached; both alike have a series of five thin members, overlapping one another and supporting four animals on each capital, bullocks, elephants, horses, sphinxes, etc..., between the front and back pairs of which runs the architrave, supporting a projecting frieze, with all the details of a wooden framing copied in it. The upper part of the frieze in this case is richly carved with a string course of animals under a richly carved rail, resembling in its design and elaborateness the rails at Amravati, with which this vihara must be nearly, if not quite contemporary. The pillars stand on a bench in the veranda, and in front of them is a carved screen, supported by three dwarfs on each side the steps to the entrance. 
The details of this cave and No.10 are so alike that the one must be regarded as a copy of the other, but the capitals in No.10 are so like those of the Karla Caves Chaitya, while those in the veranda of this cave are so much poorer in proportion, that one is tempted to suppose this belongs to a later period, when art had begun to decay.

Comparison with other sites
The architecture of the Nahapana cave (Cave No.10) is very similar to that of the Karla Caves Great Chaitya. Conversely, the architecture of Cave No.3 is very similar to that of the Kanheri Chaitya. This suggest that the two viharas cannot be very distant in date from the two Chaityas.

Inscriptions

One long inscription (inscription No.2) in the 19th year of Satavahana king Sri Pulumavi (2nd century CE), explaining that Queen Gotami Balasiri, mother of glorious king Gotamiputra, caused this cave to be built and gave it to the Samgha. There is also another long inscription (inscription No.3) by Sri Pulumavi himself, also in the 22nd year of his reign. There are also inscriptions (inscriptions No.4 and No.5) at the entrance of the cave by Gautamiputra Satakarni (2nd century), in the 18th year of his reign, who claims a great victory.

One of the most important Nasik Caves inscription was made by Gautamiputra's mother the great queen Gotami Balasiri, during the reign of her grandson Vasishthiputra Pulumavi, in order to record the gift of Cave No3. The full inscription consists in a long eulogy of Gautamiputra Satakarni, mentioning his valour, his military victories, and then her gift of a cave in the Nasik Caves complex.

The most important passages on this inscription related to the military victories of Gautamiputra Satakarni, in particular:
 the claim that Gautamiputra Satakarni "destroyed the Sakas, Yavanas and Palhavas", alluding respectively to the Western Satraps, the Indo-Greeks and the Indo-Parthians
 the claim that Gautamitra Satakarni "rooted out the Khakharata race" and "restored the glory of the Satavahana family". The Khakharata refers to the Kshaharata dynasty, the family branch of Nahapana, the important Western Satraps ruler.

The full inscription, located on the back wall of the veranda above the entrance, reads:

The next inscription is located right under the inscription of the Queen, only separated by a swastika and another symbol. The inscription (inscription No.3) was made by Sri Pulumavi himself, in the 22nd year of his reign, and records the gift of a village for the welfare of the monks dwelling in the cave built by his grandmother.

The next inscription of the cave is very important in that it seems to record the appropriation by king Gautamiputra Satakarni of a land previously owned by Nahapana's viceroy Usubhadata, builder of Cave No.10, thereby confirming the capture of territory by the Satavahanas over the Western Satraps. Since his mother made the final dedication of the cave during the reign of his son (inscription No.2 above), Gautamiputra Satakarni may have started the cave, but not finished it. The inscription is on the east wall of the veranda in Cave No. 3, under the ceiling.

A final inscription, written as a continuation of the previous one, and only separated by a swastika, describes a correction to the previous inscription, as the donated lands and villages turned to be inappropriate. The inscription reads:

Caves No.4-9

Cave No.10 "Nahapana Vihara" (circa 120 CE)

The cave
Cave No10 is the second largest Vihara, and contains six inscriptions of the family of Nahapana. The six pillars (two of them attached) have more elegant bell-shaped capitals than those in Cave No.3, and their bases are in the style of those in the Karla Caves Chaitya, and in that next to the Granesa Lena at Junnar; the frieze also, like those that remain on the other small caves between Nos.4 and 9, is carved with the simple rail pattern. At each end of the verandah is a cell, donated by "Dakhamitra, the daughter of King Kshaharata Kshatrapa Nahapana, and wife of Ushavadata, son of Dinika."

Inside hall
The inside hall is about 43 feet wide by 45 feet deep, and is entered by three plain doors, and lighted by two windows. It has five benched cells on each side and six in the back; it wants, however, the bench round the inner sides that can be found in Cave No.3; but, as shown by the capital and ornaments still left, it has had a precisely similar dagoba in low relief on the back wall, which has been long afterwards hewn into a figure of Bhairava. Outside the veranda, too, on the left-hand side, have been two reliefs of this same god, evidently the later insertions of some Hindu devotee.

Comparisons
Since Nahapana was a contemporary of Gautamiputra Satakarni, by whom he was finally vanquished, this cave predates by one generation Cave No.3, completed in the 18th year of the reign of Gautamiputra's son Sri Pulumavi. Cave No.10 is probably contemporary with Cave No.17, built by an Indo-Greek "Yavana".

Nahapana is also known for having built the Great Chaitya in Karla Caves, the largest Chaitya building of Southern Asia. Cave No.10 and the Karla Caves Chaitya are extremely similar in style, and thought to be essentially contemporary.

Inscriptions

 

The inscriptions of cave no.10 reveal that in 105-106 CE, Western Satraps defeated the Satavahanas after which Kshatrapa Nahapana’s son-in-law and Dinika’s son- Ushavadata donated 3000 gold coins for this cave as well as for the food and clothing of the monks. The main inscription on the doorfront (inscription No.10) is the earliest known instance of the usage of Sanskrit, although a rather hybrid form, in western India.

Usabhdatta’s wife (Nahapana’s daughter), Dakshmitra also donated one cave for the Buddhist monks. Cave 10 - 'Nahapana Vihara' is spacious with 16 rooms.

Over the doorway of the left cell appears the following inscription:

Two inscriptions in Cave 10 mentions the building and the gift of the whole cave to the Samgha by Ushavadata, the son-in-law and viceroy of Nahapana:

Caves No.11, "Jain cave"
Cave No.11 is close to Cave No.10, but at a somewhat higher level. In the left end of the veranda is the fragment of a seat; the room inside is 11 feet 7 inches by 7 feet 10 inches, having a cell, 6 feet 8 inches square, at the left end, and another, not quite so large, at the back, with a bench at the side and back. In the front room is carved, on the back wall, in low relief, a sitting figure and attendants on a lion throne, and on the right-end wall a fat figure of Amba on a tiger with attendants, and an Indra on an elephant: all are small, clumsily carved, and evidently of late Jaina workmanship.

Cave No.11 has one inscription mentioning it is the gift of the son of a writer: " the benefaction of Ramanaka, the son of Sivamitra, the writer." Cave No.12 has one inscription mentioning it is the gift of a merchant named Ramanaka. Cave No.13 has no inscriptions.

Caves No.12-16

Cave No.17, "Yavana vihara" (circa 120 CE)

Cave No.17 was built by a devotee of Greek descent, who presents his father as being a Yavana from the northern city of Demetriapolis. The cave is dated to around 120 CE.

The cave
Inside hall
Cave 17 is the third large Vihara, though smaller than Nos.3, 10, 20, and has been executed close to the upper portion of the Chaitya cave. The hall measures 22 feet 10 inches wide by 32 feet 2 inches deep, and has a back aisle screened off by two columns, of which the elephants and their riders and the thin square members of the capitals only are finished. The steps of the shrine door have also been left as a rough block, on which a Hindu has carved the shalunkha, or receptacle for a linga. The shrine has never been finished. On the wall of the back aisle is a standing figure of Buddha, 3.5 feet high; in the left side of the hall, 2 feet 3 inches from the floor, is a recess, 18.5 feet long and 4 feet 
3 inches high by 2 feet deep, intended for a seat or perhaps for a row of metallic images; a cell has been attempted at each end of this, but one of them has entered the aisle of the Chaitya-cave just below, and the work has then been stopped. On the right side are four cells without benches.
Veranda
The veranda is somewhat peculiar, and it would seem that, at first, a much smaller cave was projected, or else by some mistake it was begun too far to the left. It is ascended 
by half a-dozen steps in front between the two central octagonal pillars with very short shafts, and large bases and capitals, the latter surmounted by elephants and their riders, and the frieze above carved with the plain "rail pattern". They stand on a paneled base; but the landing between the central pair is opposite the left window in the back wall of the veranda, to the right of which is the principal door, but to the left of the window is also a narrower one. The veranda has then been prolonged to the west, and another door broken out to the outside beyond the right attached pillar; at this end of the veranda also is an unfinished cell.

Comparisons
The cave is later than the Chaitya next it, and the veranda a little later in style than the Nahapana Cave No.10. The interior with an image of the Buddha, was probably executed at a later date, around the 6th century CE. Fergusson states later in his book that, from an architectural standpoint, Cave No.17 is contemporary with the Great Chatya at the Karla Caves, but is actually a bit earlier in style than Cave No.10 of Nahapana at Nasik, but at no great interval of time.

Inscription

Cave No.17 has one inscription, mentioning the gift of the cave by Indragnidatta the son of the Yavana (i.e. Greek or Indo-Greek) Dharmadeva. It is located on the back wall of the veranda, over the main entrance, and is inscribed in large letters:

The city of "Dattamittri" may be the city of Demetrias in Arachosia, mentioned by Isidore of Charax. This vihara is probably contemporary to the reign of Western Satrap Nahapana, circa 120 CE.
The word "Yoṇaka", which was the current Greek Hellenistic form, is used in the inscription, instead of "Yavana", which was the Indian word to designate the Indo-Greeks. 
The Yavanas are also known for their donations with inscriptions at the Great Chaitya at the Karla Caves, and at the Manmodi Caves in Junnar.

Cave No. 18: the Chaitya

The cave

Cave No.18 is a chaitya design, comparable to the Karla Caves Chaitya, although earlier and much smaller and simpler in design. It is the only Chaitya cave of the group, belongs to a much earlier date; and though none of the three inscriptions on it supplies certain information on this point, yet the name of Maha Hakusiri, found in one of them, tends to push it back to some period about or before the Christian era. The carving, however, over the door and the pilasters with animal capitals on the façade on each side the great arch, and the insertion of the hooded snake, will, on comparison with the façades at Bedsa and Karla, tend to suggest an early date for this cave.

Chronology
Chaitya No. 18 participates to a chronology of several other Chaitya caves which were built in Western India under royal sponsorship. It is thought that the chronology of these early Chaitya Caves is as follows: first Cave 9 at Kondivite Caves, then Cave 12 at the Bhaja Caves and Cave 10 of Ajanta Caves, around the 1st century BCE. Then, in chronological order: Cave 3 at Pitalkhora, Cave 1 at Kondana Caves, Cave 9 at Ajanta Caves, which, with its more ornate designs, may have been built about a century later, Only then appears Cave 18 at Nasik Caves, to be followed by Cave 7 at Bedse Caves, and finally by the "final perfection" of the Great Chaitya at Karla Caves (circa 120 CE).

Doorway
The doorway is evidently of an early date, and the ornament up the left side is almost identical with that found on the pillars of the northern gateway at Sanchi, with which it consequently is in all probability coeval (1st century CE). The carving over the doorway, which represents the wooden framework which filled all openings, of a similar class, at that age, is of a much more ornamental character than usual, or than the others shown on this facade. Animals are introduced as in the Lomas Rishi. So also are the trisulas and shield emblems, in a very ornamental form, but almost identical with those existing in the Manmodi cave at Junnar, which is probably of about the same age as this Chaitya.

Hall
The interior measures 38 feet 10 inches by 21 feet 7 inches, and the nave, from the door up to the dagoba, 25 feet 4 inches by 10 feet, and 23 feet 3 inches high. The cylinder of the dagoba is 5.5 feet in diameter and 6 feet 3 inches high, surmounted by a small dome and very heavy capital. The gallery under the great arch of the window is supported by two pillars, which in all cases in the Chaitya caves are in such a form as strongly to suggest that a wooden frame was fastened between them, probably to hold a 
screen, which would effectually shut in the nave from observation from outside. Five octagonal pillars, with high bases of the Karle pattern but without capitals, on each side the nave, and five without bases round the dagoba, divide off the side aisles.

The woodwork that once occupied the front arch, and the roof of the nave has long ago disappeared. Whether there ever were pillars in advance of the present facade as at Bedsa, or a screen as at Karle, cannot be determined with certainty, unless by excavating largely among the debris in front. There was probably something of the kind, but the Viharas, inserted so close to it on either side, must have hastened the ruin of the side walls of it.

Inscriptions
The cave has several inscriptions. Inscription No.19 appears on the 5th and 6th pillars on the right aisle of the Chaitya, and explains that the cave received some perfecting by the wife of a government official, but the government in question remains unnamed:

This inscription is slightly less ancient than the inscription on the doorway, suggesting that it was inscribed some time in the later phases of the construction of the cave.

Inscription No.20 explains that the decoration above the doorway was a donation of the people of nearby Nashik ("The gift of the village of Dhambhika, of the Nasik people"). Inscription No.21 records the donation of the rail pattern.

Cave No.19 "Krishna vihara" (100-70 BCE)

Cave 19 is at a rather lower level even than the Chaitya cave, and some distance in advance of it, but the front and interior have been so filled up with earth as to conceal it from general view. It is a small Vihara, 14 feet 3 inches square, with six cells, two on each side; their doors are surmounted by the Chaitya-arch ornament connected by a frieze of "rail pattern" in some places wavy. In the front wall are two lattice windows, and in the veranda two slender square pillars, the middle portion of the shaft being chamfered to an octagonal shape.

The cave is exceedingly plain style, and the remarkable rectangularity of all its parts, agree perfectly with what might be expected in a Vihara of the first or second century BCE. Its close family likeness to Cave No.12 at Ajanta and others at Bhaja and Kondane, all of the earliest age, suggest about the same date.

The cave has one inscription of king Krishna of the Satavahanas, which is the oldest known Satavahana inscription, dated to 100-70 BCE:

Cave No.20: "Sri Yajna vihara" (circa 180 CE)

Cave No.20 is another large Vihara, its hall varying in width from 37.5 feet at the front to 44 feet at the back and 61.5 feet deep. Originally it was little over 40 feet deep, but at a much later date it was altered and extended back by one "Marma, a worshipper," as recorded on the wall. It has eight cells on each side, one on the right rather a recess than a cell, two on the left with stone beds, while in the back are two cells to the left of the antechamber and one to the right, with one more on each side of the antechamber and entered from it.

The hall is surrounded by a low bench as in Cave 3, and in the middle of the floor is a low platform, about 9 feet square, apparently intended for an asana or seat; but whether to place an image upon for worship, or as a "seat of the law", where the Thera or high priest might sit when teaching and discussing, is impossible to say. On the right-hand side, and nearer the front, are three small circular elevations in the floor much like ordinary millstones. They may be seats also for members of the clergy, or bases on which to set small moveable dagobas. But when the cave was altered and extended backward, the floor seems also to have been lowered a few inches to form the low dais and these bases.

The antechamber is slightly raised above the level of the hall, from which it is divided by two richly carved columns between antae. On either side the shrine door is a gigantic dvarapala, 9.5 feet high, with an attendant female, but so besmeared with soot for the cave has been long occupied by Bhairagis, that minor details are scarcely recognisable. These dvarapalas, however, hold lotus stalks, have the same elaborate head-dresses, with a small dagoba in the front of one, and a figure of Buddha in the other, and have the same attendants and vidyaharas flying over head as we find in the later Buddhist caves at Aurangabad.

In the shrine, too, is the colossal image of Buddha, 10 feet high, seated with his feet on a lotus flower and holding the little finger of his left hand between the thumb and forefinger of his right. He is attended by two gigantic chauri-bearer with the same distinguishing features as the dvarapala. All this points to about the 7th century CE or later, as the age 
of alteration of this cave.

Fortunately there is an inscription of the 7th year of Yajna Sri Satakarni (170-199 CE), stating that "after having been under excavation for many years " it was then carried to completion by the wife of the commander-in-chief. It is quite clear, however, that the inner and outer parts were excavated at widely different ages. This inscriptions shows, as the inscriptions of Yajna Sri Satakarni in Kanheri caves, that the Satavahanas had reclaimed the area of Kanheri and Nasik from the Western Satraps during the reign of Sri Yajna Satakarni.

The pillars of the veranda have the water-pot bases, and the bell-shaped capitals of those in Karle Chaitya. Those of the sanctuary are represented, and belong to a widely distant age. Like No.17, it has a side door near the left end of the veranda, and a cell in that end.

The façade has four octagonal pillars between antae, the shafts more slender than in any of the other caves, but the bases of the same pattern disproportionately large, as if the shafts had been reduced in thickness at a later date. They stand on a paneled base, with five low steps up to it between the middle pair. A low screen wall in front is nearly quite destroyed, except at the east end, where a passage led to a large irregular and apparently unfinished apartment with two plain octagonal pillars with square bases between pilasters in front, and having a water-cistern at the entrance.

Caves No.21-24

Routes

The caves are located high in the mountains of Trirashmi. Some caves are intricately connected by stone-cut ladders that join them to the other caves. Steps lead to the caves from the bottom of the hill. The peak of the Trirashmi Caves is also accessible by trekking of about 20 mins but the path is treacherous and dangerous.

See also

 Cetiya
 Ajanta Caves
 Bedse Caves
 Bhaja Caves
 Kanheri Caves
 Karla Caves
 Pitalkhora Caves
 Shivneri Caves

References 

Inscriptions on Cave 10, 13, 15, 16
Maharashtratil Buddha Dhammacha Itihas
M.S.More
Leni Maharashtrachi
Dawood Dalvi
https://web.archive.org/web/20130926230100/http://asi.nic.in/asi_monu_tktd_maha_pandulenacaves.asp

Sources
Harle, J.C., The Art and Architecture of the Indian Subcontinent, 2nd edn. 1994, Yale University Press Pelican History of Art,  
 Michell, George, The Penguin Guide to the Monuments of India, Volume 1: Buddhist, Jain, Hindu, 1989, Penguin Books,

External links

 Official (Government) website of Nashik District

Buddhist caves in India
Jain caves in India
Caves of Maharashtra
Indian rock-cut architecture
Former populated places in India
Tourist attractions in Nashik district
Buddhist pilgrimage sites in India
Buddhist monasteries in India
Buddhist temples in India
Architecture in India
Caves containing pictograms in India
Jain rock-cut architecture
3rd-century BC Jain temples